Richard Earl Robinson (February 3, 1903 – January 28, 1991) was a United States district judge of the United States District Court for the District of Nebraska.

Education and career

Born in Omaha, Nebraska, Robinson received a Bachelor of Laws from Creighton University School of Law in 1927. He was in private practice in Omaha from 1927 to 1956.

Federal judicial service

On June 21, 1956, Robinson was nominated by President Dwight D. Eisenhower to a seat on the United States District Court for the District of Nebraska vacated by Judge James A. Donohoe. Robinson was confirmed by the United States Senate on July 2, 1956, and received his commission the next day. He served as Chief Judge from 1957 to 1972. He assumed senior status on January 7, 1972. Robinson served in that capacity until his death on January 28, 1991.

References

Sources
 

1903 births
1991 deaths
Judges of the United States District Court for the District of Nebraska
United States district court judges appointed by Dwight D. Eisenhower
20th-century American judges
Creighton University School of Law alumni
People from Omaha, Nebraska